Common name: Cajun chorus frog

Pseudacris fouquettei is a species of chorus frog found in the south-eastern United States. It was recently separated from similar species, Pseudacris feriarum.

Description
The Cajun chorus frog is similar in morphology to other Pseudacris species, being distinguished by genetics, habitat range and advertisement call. The epithet fouquetti is a tribute to a Pseudacris researcher the 1960s and 1970s, Arizona State professor Martin J. Fouquette Jr.

Distribution
P. fouquettei is found in the southern United States, in Louisiana, Arkansas, Oklahoma, Mississippi and Texas.

Notes

External links
 
Moriarty Lemmon Lab Research

Chorus frogs
Amphibians described in 2008